Begonia serratipetala is a species of flowering plant in the genus Begonia, native to New Guinea. It has gained the Royal Horticultural Society's Award of Garden Merit.

References

serratipetala
Endemic flora of New Guinea
Plants described in 1913